Mount Forest may refer to:

Mount Forest, Ontario, Canada, an unincorporated community
Mount Forest Township, Michigan, United States
Mount Forest (New Hampshire), United States, or "Mount Forist", a small mountain